Tajrish (also romanized as Tajrīš) is a neighbourhood of Tehran, capital of Iran. Administratively it is in Shemiranat County, Tehran Province. It used to be a village and later was absorbed into the city of Tehran.

The Tajrish neighbourhood is located along the northern edge of Tehran. This neighbourhood is one of the oldest parts of Tehran and during the last few decades, has become popular with the wealthy by virtue of the low levels of pollution, in turn created by the area's favorable location along Tehran's northern hills. Tajrish is situated in the Shemiranat County.  As of 2006, the neighborhood had 86,000 inhabitants.

The Tajrish Square itself is known as Sar-e Pol-e Tajrish. This square is actually a vast bridge on top of a qanat river. In older times the locals used to call this bridge Gowgal, meaning "[The Bridge] of the Cow Herd.

History 
The location of the neighborhood was once an ancient village, and in 1788, the Qajar dynasty choose this as their capital. It is known for its mountainous landscape. The area was often used as a summer retreat by city residents. 

Until the 1920s, Tajrish and neighboring Shemiranat were a collection of small villages along Tehran's border. The area was relatively disconnected from Tehran's urban with the exception of Old Shemiran Road, currently known as Shariati Avenue. With the construction of Pahlavi Road (now named Valiasr Street) in 1930s and Modarres Highway, then known as Shahanshahi Boulevard, the Northern suburbs became highly accessible from downtown and rapid extension became possible.

Modern day 

Popular tourist spots in Tajrish are the old bazaar and a mausoleum called Imam Zadeh Saleh. 

Tajrish Square is currently one of the busiest parts of Tehran, with bus terminals, cab terminals. It is the location of shopping malls, including the popular Tandis Center. The square also the location of street performers, and where people gather to publicly celebrate holidays.

A number of Shia Islam religious sites are located here, including the mausoleum called Imam Zadeh Saleh, a shrine called , and a few Takyehs or religious buildings (such as Takyeh Borzog, Takyeh Pa'in).

The square is where Valiasr Street terminates. Valiasr is the longest and, along with Shariati Avenue, one of the most important streets in Tehran. It is also one of the busiest transportation hubs in Tehran. Many other suburbs are accessible from this square. A major metro station, the northern terminus of line one (the red line) is located here.

Tajrish is at the junction of streets that lead to Saad Abad Palace, Velenjak, Asad Abad, Zafaraniyeh, Elahieh, and Niavaran as well as many of the other places in northern Tehran.

Tajrish Bazaar 

Tehran has two bazaars, the Tajrish Bazaar is located in the north and the Grand Bazaar is located in the south of the city. The bazaar was developed in the 18th-century (although some sources state early 19th-century), and was associated with the village of Shemiranat and the Qajar dynasty. The location of the Tajrish Bazaar is bound by Panzandeh-e Kordad Street, Molavi Street, Mostafa Khomeini Street, and Khayyam Street.

Tajrish Bazaar has been built according to architectural style which closely resembles the Grand Bazaar in downtown Tehran. Some of its arches have been destroyed due to construction of multi-story buildings and its traditional identity has been threatened by irregularity of window shops and external view of new stores. Tajrish Bazaar includes a roofed passageway through which thousands of people pass en route to either paying pilgrimage the Emamzadeh Saleh or to the bazaar for purchasing goods.

The traditional bazaar of Tajrish neighborhood has been renovated by the Tehran Beautification Organization, which featured reconstruction of the traditional market using both traditional and modern styles, wastewater collection, power, gas, telecommunication installations, as well as repair of small and large shops and passageways.

Geography 
Tajrish is located at the foot of the Alborz mountain range and Tajrish Square is located at an altitude of 1600 meters above sea level. Tajrish's climate is temperate and cold. The maximum temperature in summer is 36 degrees and the minimum in winter is -20 degrees. There have been several aqueducts in Tajrish and some of them are still flowing. Among them are Imam Zadeh Saleh aqueduct , Mohammadieh aqueduct, Maghsoudbak aqueduct along Darband river, Sarpol Tajrish aqueduct and Kahrizak aqueduct which was manifested in the lower support of Tajrish.

Population 
The population of the city of Tajrish in 1335 was 26,525 and in the census of 1365 was about 40,000.In the 1996 census, due to Tajrish being connected to the city of Tehran and being located in the Greater Tehran area, its population was mentioned along with the population of Tehran.

Language dialect 
Tajrishi is also a dialect of Persian, which is nowadays almost extinct and has been replaced by standard Persian. The etymology of the word Tajrish itself is unknown.

Iranian linguist Habib Borjian, after examining all the available material at hand concerning this dialect confirms it is a dialect of the Persian and writes: "Tajrishi shows no divergence from the Persid group, despite minor variation with respect to modern standard Persian. It is in verb morphology that we do find in Tajrishi a massive Caspian overlay, imposed on the dialect by means of age-old socio-economic ties with the districts to its north in the Alborz chain. We may thus characterize Tajrishi and
other Shemirāni dialects as Persian with a significant Caspian imprint. Surprisingly enough, we find no trace of a Northwestern Iranian substratum in the dialect of Tajrish, nor do we find it in the scanty material available to us about the other extinct vernaculars of Shemirān ... This situation can only attest to an early Persianization of Rey and its adjoining settlements."

Gallery

References

External links 

Neighbourhoods in Tehran
Shemiranat County